Charles John Chetwynd-Talbot, 19th Earl of Shrewsbury, 19th Earl of Waterford, 4th Earl Talbot, PC (13 April 1830 – 11 May 1877), styled Viscount of Ingestre between 1849 and 1868, was a British Conservative politician. He served as Captain of the Honourable Corps of Gentlemen-at-Arms under Benjamin Disraeli between 1875 and 1877.

Background
Chetwynd-Talbot was the eldest son of Admiral Henry Chetwynd-Talbot, 18th Earl of Shrewsbury, and his wife Lady Sarah Elizabeth, daughter of Henry Beresford, 2nd Marquess of Waterford. On 22 May 1849, he was commissioned a lieutenant in the Staffordshire Yeomanry. He purchased a commission as cornet and sub-lieutenant in the 1st Regiment of Life Guards on 17 January 1851. Ingestre was promoted to a captaincy in the Yeomanry on 25 March 1851, and purchased a lieutenancy in the Life Guards on 5 August 1853. He resigned his Life Guards commission in late 1854. On 1 November 1856, he was appointed a deputy lieutenant of Staffordshire.

Political career
Ingestre entered the House of Commons as one of two representatives for Stafford in 1857, a seat he held until 1859, and later represented Staffordshire North from 1859 to 1865. On 13 July 1864, he was promoted to major in the Staffordshire Yeomanry. He represented Stamford in 1868. The latter year he succeeded his father in the earldom. He resigned his Yeomanry commission on 14 April 1875, and served from 1875 to 1877 as Captain of the Honourable Corps of Gentlemen-at-Arms in the second Conservative administration of Benjamin Disraeli and was sworn of the Privy Council in 1874.

Family
Lord Shrewsbury married Anna Theresa Cockerell (1836–1912), daughter of Captain Richard Howe Cockerell RN (d 1839 Calcutta) by his wife Theresa Newcomen, later Lady Eglinton, in 1855. The new Lady Shrewsbury was stepdaughter to the 13th Earl, and half-sister to the 14th and 15th Earls.  They had four children - Lady Theresa Susey Helen, Lady Guendolen Theresa, Lady Muriel Frances Louisa, and Charles, 20th Earl.

Their elder daughter Lady Theresa married the 6th Marquess of Londonderry, and was the mother of the 7th Marquess. A younger daughter, Lady Muriel, married William Duncombe, Viscount Helmsley, and was the mother of the second Earl of Feversham. She was also active in the Garden City movement. Shrewsbury died suddenly in May 1877, aged only 47, and was succeeded in the earldom by his only legitimate son Charles. The Countess of Shrewsbury died in July 1912, aged 76.

Lord Shrewsbury also had an illegitimate child with a maid, producing a son. The son was educated through funding from Lord Shrewsbury. Lord Shrewsbury's illegitimate grandson Arthur Talbot won the Croix de Guerre during the First World War, saving a Padre from behind enemy lines, despite only being a medic.

Ancestry

References

External links
 
 

1830 births
1877 deaths
Ingestre, Charles Chetwynd-Talbot, Viscount
Staffordshire Yeomanry officers
Ingestre, Charles Chetwynd-Talbot, Viscount
Members of the Privy Council of the United Kingdom
Ingestre, Charles Chetwynd-Talbot, Viscount
Ingestre, Charles Chetwynd-Talbot, Viscount
Ingestre, Charles Chetwynd-Talbot, Viscount
Shrewsbury, E19
Charles Talbot
Honourable Corps of Gentlemen at Arms
Deputy Lieutenants of Staffordshire
Earls of Shrewsbury
Earls of Waterford
Members of the Parliament of the United Kingdom for Stafford
Barons Talbot
Earls Talbot